Millville is a census-designated place (CDP) in Shasta County, California, United States. Its population is 724 as of the 2020 census, down from 727 from the 2010 census.

Geography
Millville is located at  (40.555904, -122.185250).

Demographics

2010
The 2010 United States Census reported that Millville had a population of 727. The racial makeup of Millville was 673 (92.6%) White, 0 (0.0%) African American, 6 (0.8%) Native American, 6 (0.8%) Asian, 1 (0.1%) Pacific Islander, 22 (3.0%) from other races, and 19 (2.6%) from two or more races. Hispanic or Latino of any race were 50 persons (6.9%).

The Census reported that 727 people (100% of the population) lived in households, 0 (0%) lived in non-institutionalized group quarters, and 0 (0%) were institutionalized.

There were 268 households, out of which 95 (35.4%) had children under the age of 18 living in them, 180 (67.2%) were opposite-sex married couples living together, 24 (9.0%) had a female householder with no husband present, 11 (4.1%) had a male householder with no wife present.  There were 8 (3.0%) unmarried opposite-sex partnerships, and 3 (1.1%) same-sex married couples or partnerships. 44 households (16.4%) were made up of individuals, and 24 (9.0%) had someone living alone who was 65 years of age or older. The average household size was 2.71.  There were 215 families (80.2% of all households); the average family size was 3.05.

The population was spread out, with 178 people (24.5%) under the age of 18, 42 people (5.8%) aged 18 to 24, 126 people (17.3%) aged 25 to 44, 246 people (33.8%) aged 45 to 64, and 135 people (18.6%) who were 65 years of age or older.  The median age was 47.4 years. For every 100 females, there were 93.9 males.  For every 100 females age 18 and over, there were 94.0 males.

The homeowner vacancy rate was 1.7%; the rental vacancy rate was 5.0%.  623 people (85.7% of the population) lived in owner-occupied housing units and 104 people (14.3%) lived in rental housing units.

2000
As of the census of 2000, there were 610 people, 217 households, and 182 families residing in the CDP. The racial makeup of the CDP was 95.41% White, 0.16% Native American, 1.15% Asian, 0.66% from other races, and 2.62% from two or more races. Hispanic or Latino of any race were 2.79% of the population.

There were 217 households, out of which 34.1% had children under the age of 18 living with them, 75.6% were married couples living together, 5.1% had a female householder with no husband present, and 16.1% were non-families. 12.4% of all households were made up of individuals, and 4.6% had someone living alone who was 65 years of age or older.  The average household size was 2.81 and the average family size was 3.05.

In the CDP, the population was spread out, with 26.4% under the age of 18, 5.4% from 18 to 24, 20.3% from 25 to 44, 33.3% from 45 to 64, and 14.6% who were 65 years of age or older.  The median age was 44 years. For every 100 females, there were 94.3 males.  For every 100 females age 18 and over, there were 95.2 males.

The median income for a household in the CDP was $51,406, and the median income for a family was $53,000. Males had a median income of $41,917 versus $27,031 for females. The per capita income for the CDP was $27,218.  About 5.9% of families and 7.9% of the population were below the poverty line, including 12.1% of those under age 18 and 2.7% of those age 65 or over.

Politics

References

Census-designated places in Shasta County, California
Census-designated places in California